The city of Disraeli is located in the Municipalité régionale de comté des Appalaches in Quebec, Canada. It is part of the Chaudière-Appalaches region and the population is 2,570 as of 2009. It was named after British statesman and writer Benjamin Disraeli.

The city of Disraeli forms an enclave in the territory of the parish of Disraeli and the two are separate legal entities.

Demographics 

Notable people 
Henri Gagnon and Irène Marcotte, parents of Rene Gagnon, one of the six US Marines who raised the second American flag atop  Mount Suribachi on February 23, 1945 as shown in the iconic photograph Raising the Flag on Iwo Jima.

References

Commission de toponymie du Québec
Ministère des Affaires municipales, des Régions et de l'Occupation du territoire 

Cities and towns in Quebec
Incorporated places in Chaudière-Appalaches
Canada geography articles needing translation from French Wikipedia